Moore Catholic High School is an American private, Catholic school in the Bulls Head neighborhood of Staten Island, New York. It was founded by the Presentation Sisters of Staten Island in September 1962 and named for Mary Young Moore, a beneficiary to the Roman Catholic Archdiocese of New York, and was the first archdiocesan high school for girls on Staten Island.

Moore became co-educational in September 1969, and the name was formally changed from Countess Moore High School to Moore Catholic High School in October 1978.

Enrollment is about 400 students, evenly divided between males and females.

Advanced academics
In 2005, Moore initiated a program called Presentation Scholars Academy for gifted students. The students are challenged and take accelerated, college-level, and Advanced Placement classes. The school also has a partnership with St. John's University, a large Catholic university that gives academic credit to Moore students for college-level extension courses.

Clubs
School clubs include National Honor Society, Student Council, The Game Club, Teaching the Christian Message, Yearbook, International Club, Interact Club, and The Art Club.

Electives
Senior Electives:  Creative Writing, American Sign Language, Theology, Sociology, Psychology, Statistics,  Criminal Justice, Immunology, AP Calculus, AP English, AP US History, & AP Biology.

Events
The school has several annual events:
Freshman Field Day, Senior Costume Day, Junior Prom, Senior Prom, Hall of Fame Dinner and Golf Outing, Performing Arts Dinner Cabaret, Coaches for Cancer Basketball Tournament, Fall play, Christmas Spectacular and Spring musical, Dance and Music Recitals.

Athletics
Moore Catholic offers basketball, baseball, football, softball, lacrosse, soccer, co-ed cheerleading, bowling, and track and field,  and Nick Giannatasio is the Varsity Football Coach.

Faculty
Moore Catholic is staffed by the Daughters of Our Lady of the Garden, and dedicated lay faculty and staff. 28 member faculty hold 22 advanced degrees.

Notable alumni

 Yancey Arias, actor
 Kathy Brier, actress
 Jennifer Esposito, actress
 Vidal Hazelton, football wide receiver
 Shea Spitzbarth, baseball player

References

External links
Moore Catholic High School, official website

1962 establishments in New York City
Educational institutions established in 1962
Presentation Sisters schools
Roman Catholic high schools in Staten Island